Waco is an American television miniseries, developed by John Erick Dowdle and Drew Dowdle, that premiered on January 24, 2018, on Paramount Network. The six-episode series dramatizes the 1993 standoff between the Federal Bureau of Investigation (FBI), the Bureau of Alcohol, Tobacco, Firearms and Explosives (ATF), and the Branch Davidians in Waco, Texas and stars Michael Shannon, Taylor Kitsch, Andrea Riseborough, Paul Sparks, Rory Culkin, Shea Whigham, Melissa Benoist, John Leguizamo, Julia Garner, and Glenn Fleshler. The miniseries received a mixed response from critics who praised the performances and tension, but criticized the show's sympathetic approach to Branch Davidian leader David Koresh. A sequel titled Waco: The Aftermath is set to premiere on April 16, 2023, on Showtime.

Premise
Waco is a dramatized exploration of the 51-day 1993 standoff between the FBI, ATF and David Koresh's religious faction, the Branch Davidians, in Waco, Texas, that culminated in a fatal fire. It investigates the tragedy before and during the standoff, from a variety of viewpoints of those most personally associated with the two sides of the dispute.

Cast and characters

Main

Recurring

Guest

Notes

Episodes

Series epilogue
The series epilogue reads: "The FBI denied using incendiary devices that would ignite a fire.  They claimed the Branch Davidian intentionally started the fire in an apparent mass suicide.  The Justice Department's Danforth Report in 2000 concluded the fire was started by the Branch Davidians.  The report also acknowledged that the FBI had used incendiary flash-bang grenades in the assault.  Surviving Branch Davidians maintain that there was never a plan for mass suicide.  FBI Negotiators successfully secured the release of 35 Branch Davidians during the siege.  As a result of the tragedy in Waco, 76 Branch Davidians died in the fire.  25 of them were children."

Production

Development
John Erick Dowdle and Drew Dowdle initially conceived the project as a feature film. That original work eventually developed into a film script that ended up being around 150 pages. Concerned about its length, the brothers even changed the margins in an attempt to make the script shorter and therefore increasing their chances of interesting a studio. Eventually, Drew decided to convert their film project into a limited series, despite never having attempted that sort of format before. After bringing their project to The Weinstein Company, the producers agreed that the story would best be served in a longer format.

On August 30, 2016, it was announced that The Weinstein Company, through their Weinstein Television arm, was developing a television miniseries based upon the 1993 Branch Davidian siege in Waco, Texas. It was reported that John Erick Dowdle and Drew Dowdle would write the series with the former directing. The series is based on two biographies: A Place Called Waco, by Branch Davidian survivor David Thibodeau, and Stalling for Time: My Life as an FBI Hostage Negotiator, written by the FBI's Special Agent in Charge of Negotiations Gary Noesner. During the pre-production process, the Dowdle brothers spent a week at the Baylor University archives, where they have the largest collection related to the Waco siege, in order to conduct further research for the series.

On October 26, 2016, it was announced that Spike had picked up the rights to the series; Spike TV was later rebranded as Paramount Network in January 2018. On April 21, 2017, it was reported that Salvatore Stabile and Sarah Nicole Jones had joined the writing staff and that four episodes would be directed by John Erick Dowdle with the remaining two directed by Dennie Gordon.

Casting

Alongside the series order announcement, it was confirmed that Michael Shannon and Taylor Kitsch had been cast as Gary Noesner and David Koresh, respectively. On March 24, 2017, it was announced that John Leguizamo had joined the cast in the role of ATF agent Robert Rodriguez. Later that month, Andrea Riseborough, Rory Culkin, Paul Sparks, and Shea Whigham were also added as series regulars. In April 2017, it was reported that Melissa Benoist and Julia Garner had boarded the series as regulars. A few days later, Camryn Manheim, Eric Lange, Annika Marks, Steven Culp, and Sarah Minnich were revealed to have been cast in recurring roles.

Kitsch underwent a great deal of preparation and physical transformation for the role of Koresh. This included losing a substantial amount of weight, growing out his hair, and learning to play the guitar.

Filming
In March 2017, it was reported that the series was set to be filmed in Santa Fe County, New Mexico. On April 10, 2017, the New Mexico Film Office issued a press release stating that principal photography would begin in mid-April and last through the end of June.

Release

Marketing
On September 26, 2017, Paramount released the first trailer for the series. A second trailer was released in November.

Weinstein controversy
On October 9, 2017, it was announced that following reports of sexual abuse allegations against producer Harvey Weinstein, his name would be removed from the series' credits as would The Weinstein Company as well. On January 15, 2018, Kevin Kay, president of Paramount Network, clarified that Waco would not have The Weinstein Company's credits or logo on them, even though that company was involved in the production, with Harvey Weinstein also serving as executive producer. Furthermore, he stated that they intend to replace Weinstein Television with the company's new name in the show's credits when available.

Premiere
On January 24, 2018, the series had its official world premiere at Paley Center for Media in New York City. The premiere included a screening of the first episode and a discussion moderated by The New York Timess Dave Itzkoff with the cast and crew featuring Taylor Kitsch, Michael Shannon, Rory Culkin, Andrea Riseborough, Gary Noesner, David Thibodeau, John Erick Dowdle, and Drew Dowdle.

Reception

Critical response
The series was met with a mixed response from critics upon its premiere. On the review aggregation website Rotten Tomatoes, the series holds a 70% approval rating with an average rating of 6.6 out of 10 based on 46 reviews. The website's critical consensus reads, "Waco brings its fact-based drama to life with an outstanding ensemble, though its sympathetic approach to the main character may offend some viewers." Metacritic, which uses a weighted average, assigned the series a score of 56 out of 100 based on 15 critics, indicating "mixed or average reviews".

Matt Zoller Seitz of New York Magazine offered the series restrained praise saying, "It doesn't go nearly as far as it could've, given what a quietly charismatic star it has in Taylor Kitsch as David Koresh, and how immediately human all of his followers seem. All that being said, this is still a necessary and sometimes powerful series, particularly in the third hour, which depicts the initial assault on the compound that led to the two-month siege." Alex McLevy of The A.V. Club praised the actors' performances while criticizing the series' writing saying, "In every case, the actor elevates the material, raising passable storytelling to a more compelling and charismatic level." Mike Hale of The New York Times gave the series a mixed review, saying, "Waco is a workmanlike summary of events that paints a largely, some might say excessively, sympathetic portrait of Koresh and his followers. This is likely because of the demands of dramatic compression rather than any propagandizing on the part of the show's makers." In a negative review, Lorraine Ali of The Los Angeles Times commented, "Waco isn't skillful enough to weave all the opposing perspectives here into a three-dimensional story, where the ultimate victims are the innocent folk betrayed by their leader and their government. It's so busy delivering Spam-sized chunks of ham-fisted dialogue defending the misunderstood Koresh, it loses all those other critical threads that make Waco a cautionary tale for all sides."

Ratings
In addition to airing on the Paramount Network, episodes of the miniseries were simulcast on CMT.

Awards and nominations

Other media

Revelations of Waco
Revelations of Waco is a companion documentary series released exclusively on the Paramount Network website and YouTube channel following the initial airing of each episode of the miniseries. The series reveals the true to life details of the Waco siege through interviews with those on both sides of the conflict. Each episode runs between nine and thirteen minutes in length.

Soundtrack
Sony Classical has released a soundtrack album for the series that features selections of the show's original music composed by Jeff Russo and Jordan Gagne.

Sequel series

A follow-up series titled Waco: The Aftermath is set to premiere on April 16, 2023, on Showtime. It centers on the fallout from the Waco siege as well as the emerging patriot movement and features Michael Shannon, John Leguizamo, Shea Whigham and Annika Marks reprising their roles from the original miniseries.

References

External links
 
 

2018 American television series debuts
2018 American television series endings
2010s American television miniseries
American biographical series
Branch Davidianism
Bureau of Alcohol, Tobacco, Firearms and Explosives in fiction
English-language television shows
New religious movements in popular culture
Paramount Network original programming
Television series about Christianity
Television series about the Federal Bureau of Investigation
Television series set in 1992
Television series set in 1993
Television shows filmed in New Mexico
Television shows set in Waco, Texas
Waco siege